"Be My Escape" is a song by American Christian rock band Relient K. It was released in November 2004 as the lead single from their fourth full-length album, Mmhmm (2004). The song was their first entry on the US Billboard Hot 100, where it peaked at number 82 and is usually referred to as Relient K's most popular mainstream song, other than "Who I Am Hates Who I've Been". The song is Relient K's fourth most popular song on iTunes. The song was certified gold in the US on October 5, 2005.

"Be My Escape" was featured in the 2006 Men's U.S. Open Tennis Championship, with the song's opening guitar solo playing as the event headed into a commercial.

Song
The song is the singer's plea for "escape" from his past mistakes. Although the lyrics avoid directly mentioning God, given the band's Christian background and some of the themes in the song, it is usually taken to refer to Him. "Be My Escape" uses guitars, drums, and keyboards, and the pace is varied effectively to give a sense of longing and desperation. The last forty seconds or so are a slow epilogue, with no instruments other than the drums, vibraphone and piano.

The song's lyrics at the beginning of the verses are often mistaken. Many have thought the first lines of the two verses to be "I'm giving up, I'm giving up slowly" and "I'm giving up, I'm doing this alone now". The actual lines from the beginning of the first two verses are "I've given up on givin' up slowly" and "I've given up on doing this alone now".

An acoustic version of the song was released in November 2005 on the Apathetic EP. It included the addition of a mandolin.

The song has more or less been in every position of Relient K's set list since the band started performing it. From the release of Mmhmm until October 2005, the song was mainly played a little past the halfway point of the band's set. For the Panic With A K Tour in October 2005, it and "I So Hate Consequences" were the encore songs in that order. From the Matt Hoopes Birthday Tour in February 2006 through the 06 festival season, it was the opening song. The band moved it to the second song for the 2006 Nintendo Fusion Tour. For basically all of 2007, it was included in a three-song encore of "Sadie Hawkins Dance", "Be My Escape", and "I So Hate Consequences". In 2008, it once again become the band's opening song, with a slightly modified opening to include a little more guitar and drums before the song really begins. The song was moved to second in the set list for the November and December 2008 Winter Wonder Slam Tour with TobyMac. For some 2009 shows so far, it has been near the end of the set.

Music video

The music video shows the band playing in a room where the walls are slowly closing in on them. At the end, a burst of light appears and the walls of the room fall down, but away from the band. The band then plays in an open field with the album cover's sunflowers in it, with the background shot on a blue screen. Lead singer Matt Thiessen has been quoted as being a little unhappy with it, claiming that the band wanted more animation other than clouds. The moving walls were simply stagehands pushing them inwards. Still, they did not complain about the video other than Thiessen's one mention of those details. Some fans wondered about the inclusion of a girl in this video when the song has Christian themes, but others have pointed out that it still works as it could be asking Jesus for escape from a problem with the girl in the video. This video was the first Relient K music video to feature bassist John Warne and guitarist Jon Schneck.

In addition, the piano solo at the end of the song was removed in the video, and an extra vocal line was added during the second and third refrains to add to the harmony. The opening guitar riff was also shorter, repeated only once instead of thrice unlike the original song. Exclusions visually include Dave Douglas singing background vocals, and Matt Thiessen playing the piano. The music video was directed by Charles Jensen and produced by Rachel Curl.

Awards
The song was nominated for two Dove Awards at the 37th GMA Dove Awards: Pop/Contemporary Recorded Song of the Year and Short Form Music Video of the Year.

Track listing
US promo CD
 "Be My Escape" (radio edit) – 3:12

Credits
 Matt Thiessen – lead vocals, guitar, piano
 Matt Hoopes – guitar
 Dave Douglas – drums, backing vocals
 Brian Pittman – bass

Charts

Certifications

Release history

References

2005 singles
Capitol Records singles
Relient K songs
Songs written by Matt Thiessen
2004 songs